The El Modelo Block (also known as the Plaza Hotel) is a historic hotel in Jacksonville, Florida. It is located at 501-513 West Bay Street. On October 16, 1980, it was added to the U.S. National Register of Historic Places.

References

External links
Florida's Office of Cultural and Historical Programs
Duval County listings
El Modelo Block

Office buildings in Jacksonville, Florida
Buildings and structures in Jacksonville, Florida
History of Jacksonville, Florida
National Register of Historic Places in Jacksonville, Florida
Historic American Buildings Survey in Florida
Northbank, Jacksonville